Love Is the Foundation is the twenty-third solo studio album by American country music singer-songwriter Loretta Lynn. It was released on August 13, 1973, by MCA Records.

Critical reception

In the August 25, 1973 issue, Billboard published a review that said, "For the never-ending stream of Loretta Lynn fans, here's another fine album to add to her never-ending string of good ones. Good variety of material and lots of Loretta." The review also noted "What Sundown Does to You", "Hey Loretta", and "You're Still Lovin' Me" as the best cuts on the album.

Cashbox also published a review in their August 25 issue which said, "This is the sort of album you put on the turntable and walk away. It plays itself. It's instant programming. "What Sundown Does to You", is a heavy mover. "Satin Sheets" is a case where Loretta's vocals reach down your throat and pull your heart, twist it, and wring it out. Whew! She does Kristofferson's "Why Me", and Shel Silverstein's "Hey Loretta", and "Five Fingers Left", which she wrote herself
and which is a very strong personal statement. Loretta is a strong lady, with a strong voice, but her smile strikes deep into your heart. This LP captures all of that."

Commercial performance 
The album peaked at No. 1 on the US Billboard Hot Country LP's chart and No. 183 on the US Billboard Top LP's & Tape chart.

The album's first single, "Love Is the Foundation", was released in April 1973 and peaked at No. 1 on the US Billboard Hot Country Singles chart. It also peaked at No. 1 on the RPM Country Singles chart in Canada. The second single, "Hey Loretta", was released in October 1973 and peaked at No. 3 on the US Billboard Hot Country Singles chart and No. 1 on the RPM Country Singles chart in Canada.

Recording 
Recording sessions for the album took place at Bradley's Barn in Mount Juliet, Tennessee, on March 5, 27 and 28, 1973. One additional session followed on May 31. "Five Fingers Left" was recorded on December 8, 1969, during a session for 1970's Loretta Lynn Writes 'Em and Sings 'Em.

Track listing

Personnel 
Adapted from the album liner notes and Decca recording session records.
Willie Ackerman – drums
Harold Bradley – bass guitar
Owen Bradley – producer
Ray Edenton – electric guitar
Lawrence Fried – photography
Lloyd Green – steel guitar
Buddy Harman – drums
Darrell Johnson - mastering
The Jordanaires – background vocals
Jerry Kennedy – guitar
Billy Linneman – bass
Loretta Lynn – lead vocals
Grady Martin – guitar
Charlie McCoy – harmonica, vibes
Bob Moore – bass
Hargus Robbins – piano
Hal Rugg – steel
Jerry Shook – guitar
Kenny Starr – liner notes
Pete Wade – guitar

Charts

Weekly charts

Year-end charts

Singles

References 

1973 albums
Loretta Lynn albums
Albums produced by Owen Bradley
MCA Records albums